Melrose Estate is a suburb of Johannesburg, South Africa. It is located in Region 3. Until the early 2000s, the suburb had many fine traditional houses, which are rapidly giving way to cluster house complexes. While probably inevitable, this is slowly defacing the suburb. With the expected building of the Gautrain station in nearby Rosebank, the suburb is likely to disappear as a tree-covered residential area.

History 
The land at the Melrose Estate of 713 acres was bought by business man Henry Brown Marshall in 1893. He would plant trees on the estate and build his home there. When the suburb was developed, the street Glenhove Road, that passes through the suburbs of Oakland, Melrose and Houghton was named after Marshall's birth estate in Scotland, Glenhove.

References

Johannesburg Region E